Protoopalina is a genus of heterokonts.

Examples are Protoopalina intestinalis and Protoopalina pingi.

Species listed by the Australian Faunal Directory are:

 Protoopalina acuta (Raff, 1911)
 Protoopalina adelaidensis Metcalf, 1923
 Protoopalina australis Metcalf, 1923
 Protoopalina bibronii Metcalf, 1940
 Protoopalina dorsalis (Raff, 1912)
 Protoopalina hylarum (Raff, 1911)
 Protoopalina jonesi Delvinquier, 1987
 Protoopalina papuensis Metcalf, 1923
 Protoopalina polykineta Grim & Clements, 1996
 Protoopalina queenslandensis Delvinquier, 1987
 Protoopalina raffae Delvinquier, 1987
 Protoopalina singeri Delvinquier, 1987
 Protoopalina tenuis (Raff, 1911)
 Protoopalina tronchini Delvinquier, 1987
 Protoopalina waterloti Delvinquier, 1987

References

Placidozoa
Heterokont genera